George Bancroft (1800–1891) was an American historian and statesman.

George Bancroft may also refer to:

George Bancroft (actor) (1882–1956), American actor
George Bancroft (translator) (died 1573), English clergyman and translator
USS George Bancroft (SSBN-643), a United States Navy fleet ballistic missile submarine in commission from 1966 to 1993
George Bancroft Park, Blackpool, a municipal park and garden in the town of Blackpool in Lancashire, England

See also
Bancroft (disambiguation)

Bancroft, George